Simon the Zealot or Simon the Canaanite or Simon the Canaanean was one of the most obscure among the apostles of Jesus. A few pseudepigraphical writings were connected to him, but Saint Jerome does not include him in De viris illustribus written between 392 and 393 AD.

Identity

The name Simon occurs in all of the Synoptic Gospels and the Book of Acts each time there is a list of apostles, without further details:

The Zealot
To distinguish him from Simon Peter he is called Kananaios or Kananites, depending on the manuscript, and in the list of apostles in Luke 6:15, repeated in Acts 1:13, Zelotes, the "Zealot". Both Kananaios and Kananites derive from the Hebrew word קנאי qanai, meaning zealous, although Jerome and others mistook the word to signify the apostle was from the town of קנה Cana, in which case his epithet would have been "Kanaios", or even from the region of כנען Canaan. As such, the translation of the word as "the Cananite" or "the Canaanite" is without contemporary extra-canonic parallel.

Robert Eisenman has argued that contemporary talmudic references to Zealots refer to them as kanna'im "but not really as a group—rather as avenging priests in the Temple". Eisenman's broader conclusions, that the zealot element in the original apostle group was disguised and overwritten to make it support the assimilative Pauline Christianity of the Gentiles, are more controversial. John P. Meier argues that the term "Zealot" is a mistranslation and in the context of the Gospels means "zealous" or "religious" (in this case, for keeping the Law of Moses), as the Zealot movement apparently did not exist until 30 to 40 years after the events of the Gospels. However, neither Brandon nor Hengel support this view.

Other identifications
In the gospels Simon the Zealot is not identified with Simon the brother of Jesus mentioned in Mark 6:3:

The Catholic Encyclopedia suggests that Simon the Zealot may be the same person as Simeon of Jerusalem or Simon the brother of Jesus or both. He would then be the cousin of Jesus or a son of Joseph from a previous marriage. Another tradition holds that this is the Simeon of Jerusalem who became the second bishop of Jerusalem, although he was born in Galilee.

Later tradition

Isidore of Seville drew together the accumulated anecdotes of Simon in De Vita et Morte.

According to the Golden Legend, which is a collection of hagiographies, compiled by Jacobus de Voragine in the thirteenth century "Simon the Cananaean and Judas Thaddeus were brethren of James the Less and sons of Mary Cleophas, which was married to Alpheus."

In the apocryphal Arabic Infancy Gospel a fact related to this apostle is mentioned. A boy named Simon is bitten by a snake in his hand; he is healed by Jesus, who told the child "you shall be my disciple". The mention ends with the phrase "this is Simon the Cananite, of whom mention is made in the Gospel."

In later tradition, Simon is often associated with Jude the Apostle as an evangelizing team; in Western Christianity, they share their feast day on 28 October. The most widespread tradition is that after evangelizing in Egypt, Simon joined Jude in Persia and Armenia or Beirut, Lebanon, where both were martyred in 65 AD. This version is the one found in the Golden Legend. He may have suffered crucifixion as the Bishop of Jerusalem. According to an Eastern tradition Simon travelled to Georgia on a missionary trip, died in Abkhazia and was buried in Nicopsia. His remains were later transferred to Anacopia.

Another tradition states that he traveled in the Middle East and Africa.  Christian Ethiopians claim that he was crucified in Samaria, while Justus Lipsius writes that he was sawn in half at Suanir, Persia. However, Moses of Chorene writes that he was martyred at Weriosphora in Caucasian Iberia. Tradition also claims he died peacefully at Edessa.

Yet another tradition says he visited Roman Britain. In this account, in his second mission to Britain, he arrived during the first year of Boadicea's rebellion (60 AD). He was crucified 10 May 61 AD by the Roman Catus Decianus, at Caistor, modern-day Lincolnshire, Britain. According to Caesar Baronius and Hippolytus of Rome, Simon's first arrival in Britain was in the year A.D.44, during the Roman conquest. Nikephoros I of Constantinople writes:

Another tradition, doubtless inspired by his title "the Zealot", states that he was involved in the First Jewish–Roman War (66–73 AD).

The second century Epistle of the Apostles (Epistula Apostolorum), a polemic against gnostics, lists him among the apostles purported to be writing the letter (who include Thomas) as Judas Zelotes. Certain Old Latin translations of the Gospel of Matthew substitute "Judas the Zealot" for Thaddeus/Lebbaeus in Matthew 10:3. To some readers, this suggests that he may be identical with the "Judas not Iscariot" mentioned in John 14:22: "Judas saith unto him, not Iscariot, Our Lord, how is it that thou wilt manifest thyself unto us, and not unto the world?" As it has been suggested that Jude is identical with the Apostle Thomas (see Jude Thomas), an identification of "Simon Zelotes" with Thomas is also possible. Barbara Thiering identified Simon Zelotes with Simon Magus; however, this view has received no serious acceptance. The New Testament records nothing more of Simon, aside from this multitude of possible but unlikely pseudonyms. He is buried in the same tomb as Jude Thaddeus, in the left transept of the St. Peter's Basilica in Rome, under the altar of St. Joseph.

In Islam, Muslim exegesis and Quran commentary name the twelve apostles and include Simon amongst the disciples. Muslim tradition says that Simon was sent to preach the faith of God to the Berbers, outside North Africa.

In art, Simon has the identifying attribute of a saw because he was traditionally martyred by being sawn in half.

Sainthood
Simon, like the other Apostles, is regarded as a saint by the Roman Catholic Church, the Eastern Orthodox Churches, the Oriental Orthodox Churches, the Eastern Catholic Churches, the churches of the Anglican Communion and the Lutheran Church. Simon is remembered (with Jude) in the Church of England with a Festival on 28 October.

References

External links

 All appearances of "Simon" in the New Testament (mostly referring to Simon Peter)
 Legenda Aurea: Lives of Saints Simon and Jude
 "St. Simon the Apostle" in the Catholic Encyclopedia
 "Ὁ Ἅγιος Σίμων ὁ Ἀπόστολος ὁ Ζηλωτής". Megas Synaxaristis .

1st-century Christian martyrs
Anglican saints
Christian saints from the New Testament
Saints from the Holy Land
Twelve Apostles
Year of birth unknown